Clown of the Jungle is a 1947 American animated short film directed by Jack Hannah and produced by Walt Disney, featuring Donald Duck. It marks the first short film appearance of the Aracuan Bird, previously seen in The Three Caballeros (1944). In the short film, Donald Duck is visiting the jungle to photograph its tropical birds, but things take a turn for the worse when Donald encounters the extremely annoying Aracuan Bird.

Plot
In the South American jungle, the narrator introduces us to the various birds living there and to wildlife photographer Donald Duck intent on getting some pictures. Unfortunately, all his attempts to photograph birds are ruined by the "clown of the jungle", the Aracuan Bird. Example: when Donald attempts to photograph a chorus line of hummingbirds, the Aracuan Bird interrupts the picture with a Russian kick dance. Donald becomes aggravated to the point where he gives chase but the bird always manages to outsmart Donald and make short work of his sanity.

Voice cast
 Clarence Nash as Donald Duck
 Pinto Colvig as Aracuan Bird

Television
 Mickey's Mouse Tracks, episode #54
 Donald's Quack Attack, episode #64
 From All of Us to All of You (Sweden only)

Home media
The short was released on December 11, 2007, on Walt Disney Treasures: The Chronological Donald, Volume Three: 1947-1950 where the opening theme uses the cut-short 1947 Donald Duck theme instead of the first Mickey Mouse theme it originally used.

Additional releases include:
 Donald's Birthday Bash (VHS)

Notes
 The hammer sound from Roustabouts (a song from Disney's 1941 film Dumbo) can be heard when Donald and the Aracuan are hammering a nail.
 When Donald goes insane and starts acting like the Aracuan at the very end, he breaks the fourth wall by walking along the black iris and shrinking with it.

References

External links 
 
 Clown of the Jungle at The Internet Animation Database
 Clown of the Jungle on Filmaffinity

Donald Duck short films
Films produced by Walt Disney
1940s Disney animated short films
Films directed by Jack Hannah
Films scored by Oliver Wallace
Films set in Africa
Films set in jungles
1947 animated films
1947 films
RKO Pictures short films
Animated films about birds